Sekisui Chemical is a Plastics manufacturer with head offices in Osaka and Tokyo. The company owns a plethora of subsidiaries engaged in a variety of businesses. Sekisui has over 27,000 employees in more than eighteen countries worldwide.

History
Sekisui Chemical was founded on March 3, 1947.

In October 2020, a 45-year old researcher was accused of engaging in corporate espionage against Sekisui on behalf of Guangdong-based Chaozhou Three-Circle (Group).

Sekisui has been recognized for its environmental efforts and in 2020 was ranked as the 12th most sustainable corporation in the world by the Canadian organization Corporate Knights Inc.

References 

Manufacturing companies based in Osaka
Plastics companies of Japan
Chemical companies established in 1947
Japanese companies established in 1947
Companies listed on the Tokyo Stock Exchange